Invitation Digital Ltd is a mobile marketing company based in Bristol, UK, best known for running the website vouchercloud.

Vodafone Ventures (VfV) bought a minority shareholding in Invitation Digital Ltd in May 2011 and used seed funding to help build the platform, before Vodafone Group PLC became majority shareholders in June 2012.

History

Invitation Digital Ltd was set up in 2008 to deliver digital incentive promotions and loyalty schemes across Europe. Group sister company Invitation Media had previously published the Invitation Book, which provided printable vouchers across 14 UK cities from 2003. In February 2010 the company launched vouchercloud, turning its printable voucher book into a digital service. The launch of the website coincided with the release of the app on Apple iPhone, and was later rolled out onto Android, Blackberry and Windows Phone devices. Following Vodafone investment, vouchercloud expanded internationally in 2012, launching in Ireland in June, Malta in July and the Netherlands in November. The app and website launched in Germany in March 2013 and vouchercloud is set to expand into other countries across the globe.

vouchercloud

vouchercloud is a UK-based money-saving mobile app and online platform, providing consumers with vouchers from a range of categories, including restaurants, clothing, experiences travel, leisure, hotels and more. Vouchers can be redeemed through online voucher codes, printable vouchers and through the mobile app. vouchercloud uses affiliate networks to provide deals from national and local merchants, operating multi-channel campaigns and providing exposure across three platforms; in-store, online and m-commerce. A web-based merchant dashboard allows businesses to upload their specific branded offer directly to vouchercloud, through the website and the mobile app. In addition to operating in the UK, vouchercloud is currently available in the United States, France, Italy, Germany, Poland, the Netherlands, Malta and Ireland.

Mobile app

The Vouchercloud mobile app was launched in the UK in February 2010, and was the first mobile voucher app to feature a built in GPS tracking device which gives consumers a selection of local deals in their area. The app is available on iPhone, BlackBerry, Android and Windows Phone, and as of June 2013 has received 3.8 million downloads.

Awards

The vouchercloud app has been nominated for numerous awards and has consistently been rated the UK's leading consumer voucher app by the Sunday Times, Daily Telegraph, The Guardian and The Sun. 2012 and 2013 – Sunday Times App List – 500 best apps in the World 2011 – A4u Awards (now Performance Marketing Awards) – Best use of Mobile

References

External links
Official website

Digital marketing companies of the United Kingdom
Companies based in Bristol
Software companies of the United Kingdom
Marketing companies established in 2008
Software companies established in 2008
2008 establishments in England